Montgomery Marine Products was an American boat builder based in Dana Point, California. The company specialized in the design and manufacture of fiberglass sailboats.

The company was founded by Jerry Montgomery in 1969.

History
The first design produced was the Montgomery 12 a sailing dinghy introduced in 1972. The largest boat built was the Lyle Hess-designed Montgomery 23. Reviewer Steve Henkel reported in 2010 that the company's quality of workmanship was "fairly high" and "above average" with a "good level of attention to detail". He described the 23 as "admirably shippy". The final design, the 1980 Montgomery 15, Henkel described as "graceful".

The company ceased operations in 1995, although many of its designs were taken up by other companies, in particular Nor'Sea Yachts and Montgomery Boats. Jerry Montgomery went on to form a sailboat rigging, racing kayak and outrigger canoe design company, which is now no longer in business. He also designed the Sage 17 for Sage Marine in 2009-2010.

Boats 
Summary of boats built by Montgomery Marine Products:

Montgomery 7-11 - unknown year
Montgomery 12 - 1972
Montgomery 17 - 1973
Montgomery 17 FD - 1975
Montgomery 23 - 1979
Montgomery 15 - 1980

See also
List of sailboat designers and manufacturers

References

Montgomery Marine Products